Miguel Olaortúa Laspra (22 November 1962 – 1 November 2019) was a Peruvian Roman Catholic prelate.

Olaortúa Laspra was born in Spain in November 1962 and was ordained to the priesthood in 1988. He served as auxiliary bishop of Abbir Marius and as bishop of the Apostolic Vicariate of Iquitos, Peru, from 2011 until his death in 2019.

Notes

1962 births
2019 deaths
21st-century Roman Catholic bishops in Peru
Spanish Roman Catholic bishops in South America
Roman Catholic bishops of Iquitos